Henry Droxford Leonard (July 1886 – 3 November 1951) was an English footballer. His regular position was as a forward. He was born in Sunderland. He played for Sunderland West End, Grimsby Town, Middlesbrough, Derby County, Leicester Fosse, Manchester United and Heanor Town.

Personal life 
Leonard served in the Royal Engineers during the First World War.

References

External links
Profile at StretfordEnd.co.uk
Profile at MUFCInfo.com

1886 births
1951 deaths
English footballers
Association football forwards
Newcastle United F.C. players
Grimsby Town F.C. players
Middlesbrough F.C. players
Derby County F.C. players
Leicester City F.C. wartime guest players
Manchester United F.C. players
Heanor Town F.C. players
Southwick F.C. players
British Army personnel of World War I
Royal Engineers soldiers